Sunnyside station is a CTrain light rail station in Sunnyside, Calgary, Alberta, Canada. It serves the Northwest Line (Route 201). It is located on the exclusive light rail right of way beside 9A Street NW at 4 Avenue NW, 0.9 km northwest of the 7 Avenue & 9 Street SW interlocking. The station opened on September 7, 1987, as part of the original Northwest line. The station consists of two side-loading platforms with pedestrian crossings at both ends.

As part of Calgary Transit's plan to operate four-car trains by the end of 2014, all three-car platforms were extended. On April 16, 2012, construction started on the extension of the platform to the South as well as redevelopment of the plaza areas immediately adjacent to the east side of the station. On November 24, 2012, the new platform extension and wheelchair ramps had been re-opened however, work continued on the station plaza area on the east side until early January 2013.

History
When the Northwest Line was being planned, community residents organized to keep this station from being built as it required the demolition of many homes and the major disruption of 9A Street N.W. (a number of homes and apartment blocks which were not demolished were left with no front street access). The city pushed ahead with its plans by purchasing most of the properties along 9A Street. Eventually, as the area became accustomed to the CTrain, the properties were sold off to private interests.

Ridership
The station registered an average of 5,700 daily boardings in 2005, which by 2008 had increased to an average of 10,400.

References

CTrain stations
Railway stations in Canada opened in 1987
1987 establishments in Alberta